Pharnacia is a tropical Asian genus of stick insects in the family Phasmatidae and subfamily Clitumninae (tribe Pharnaciini).

Species
The Catalogue of Life lists:
 Pharnacia borneensis Hennemann & Conle, 2008
 Pharnacia heros Redtenbacher, 1908
 Pharnacia kalag Zompro, 2005
 Pharnacia palawanica Hennemann & Conle, 2008
 Pharnacia ponderosa Stål, 1877 - type species
 Pharnacia rex (Günther, 1928)
 Pharnacia sumatrana (Brunner von Wattenwyl, 1907)
 Pharnacia tirachus (Westwood, 1859)

References

External links
 

Phasmatodea genera
Phasmatodea of Asia